The Philippine Center for Investigative Journalism (PCIJ) is a non-profit media organization specializing in investigative journalism. It is based in Quezon City, Philippines. Established in 1989 by nine Filipino journalists, the organization funds investigative projects for both the print and broadcast media.

It has published over 1,000 investigative reports and over 1,000 articles in Philippine newspapers and magazines, produced documentaries and published more than two dozen books on current issues. The center also offers writing fellowships to deserving reporters, journalists, and academics.

Its PCIJ Story Project, launched in 2017, provides grants for projects that expose human rights abuses, misuse of public funds, and threats to free expression and press freedom.

PCIJ is one of two Philippine organizations belonging to the Global Investigative Journalism Network.

Organization
A board of editors, mostly composed of the center's founders, holds monthly meetings. A board of advisers also convenes to help determine the direction the center's endeavors will take. The center employs a 13-person staff headed by an executive director. The staff also includes five journalists, an office manager, a marketing coordinator, a researcher, and a librarian.

The PCIJ organized a series of workshop on investigating election finance in 2016, funded by the National Endowment for Democracy.

Awards
The PCIJ has been awarded nine National Book Awards, a Catholic Mass Media Award, and dozens of Jaime V. Ongpin Awards for Investigative Journalism.

The PCIJ has also won the Agence France-Presse's Kate Webb Award and the AJA Award for Press Freedom from the Asia Journalist Association.

See also
Center for Investigative Reporting
Center for Investigative Reporting (Bosnia-Herzegovina)
List of journalists killed in the Philippines

References

External links
Philippine Center for Investigative Journalism Online
Global Investigative Journalism Network

Investigative journalism
Philippine journalism organizations
Organizations established in 1989
1989 establishments in the Philippines